Justo Ruiz González (born 31 August 1969) is a retired footballer who played as a midfielder, and the manager of the Andorra under-21 national team.

Club career
Ruiz was born in Vitoria-Gasteiz, Basque Country. After five years in the Spanish Segunda División, four with Athletic Bilbao's reserves and one with SD Eibar, he continued his career in the lower leagues, including three seasons with FC Andorra (who competed in the Spanish system). In 1998–99, he represented C.F. União in Portugal's Segunda Liga.

The following summer, aged 30, Ruiz moved back to FC Andorra, and spent the remainder of his career in the country, competing well into his 30s with FC Rànger's of the microstate's Primera Divisió, with whom he signed in 2004. Starting in 2011 and during five years he acted as manager of the former club, resigning from his position in September 2016 alongside his entire staff.

International career
Ruiz won 21 caps for Spain, across five different youth levels. He appeared with the under-20 side at the 1989 FIFA World Youth Championship.

In 1996, Ruiz began representing the Andorra senior team. He played a total of 21 FIFA World Cup qualification games for his adopted country, making his last competitive appearance on 21 November 2007 against Russia at the age of 38 years and two months.

For several years, Ruiz has worked as manager of the Andorran under-21s.

International goals
Scores and results list Andorra's goal tally first.

References

External links

 (for Spain)
 (for Andorra)

1969 births
Living people
Spanish emigrants to Andorra
Naturalised citizens of Andorra
Footballers from Vitoria-Gasteiz
Spanish footballers
Andorran footballers
Association football midfielders
Segunda División players
Segunda División B players
Tercera División players
Bilbao Athletic footballers
SD Eibar footballers
Gimnàstic de Tarragona footballers
FC Andorra players
UE Figueres footballers
Liga Portugal 2 players
C.F. União players
FC Rànger's players
Spain youth international footballers
Spain under-21 international footballers
Spain under-23 international footballers
Andorra international footballers
Spanish expatriate footballers
Expatriate footballers in Portugal
Andorran football managers
FC Andorra managers